Bruno Carotenuto (born 8 May 1941) is an Italian actor. He is known for playing Antonio Baxter in A Fistful of Dollars (1964), and Tom Strike in La sceriffa (1959).

Filmography

References

External links
 

1941 births
Male actors from Rome
20th-century Italian male actors
Italian male film actors
Living people
Male Spaghetti Western actors